Love's a Luxury is a 1952 British comedy film directed by Francis Searle and starring Hugh Wakefield, Derek Bond and Michael Medwin. It was made by the Manchester-based Mancunian Films.

Plot
A theatre producer and an actor try and have a quiet week in a country cottage. Their efforts are thwarted by the arrival of a variety of wives, girlfriends and scoutmasters!

Cast 
 Hugh Wakefield as Charles Pentwick
 Derek Bond as Robert Bentley
 Michael Medwin as Dick Pentwick
 Helen Shingler as Mrs. Pentwick
 Zena Marshall as Fritzi Villiers
 Bill Shine as Clarence Mole
 Patricia Raine as Molly Harris
 Grace Arnold as Mrs. Harris

References

Bibliography 
 Chibnall, Steve & McFarlane, Brian. The British 'B' Film. Palgrave MacMillan, 2009.

External links 

1952 films
British comedy films
1952 comedy films
Films directed by Francis Searle
Films set in England
British films based on plays
British black-and-white films
Films shot in Greater Manchester
1950s English-language films
1950s British films